Elkhorn Creek is a stream in Montgomery County in the U.S. state of Missouri. It is a tributary of the West Fork of the Cuivre River.

The stream headwaters arise at  adjacent to the north side of I-70 approximately two miles southeast of New Florence. The stream flows northwest past New Florence and Montgomery City.

Elkhorn Creek was named for the resemblance of its meandering course to an elk's horn.

See also
List of rivers of Missouri

References

Rivers of Montgomery County, Missouri
Rivers of Missouri